Arizona's 19th Legislative District is one of 30 in the state, situated in Maricopa County. As of 2021, there are 29 precincts in the district, with a total registered voter population of 106,021. The district has an overall population of 247,419.

Political representation
The district is represented for the 2021–2022 Legislative Session in the State Senate by Lupe Contreras (D) and in the House of Representatives by Diego Espinoza (D) and Lorenzo Sierra (D).

References

Maricopa County, Arizona
Arizona legislative districts